Aljaž Ivačič (born 29 December 1993) is a Slovenian professional footballer who plays as a goalkeeper for Portland Timbers in Major League Soccer.

Career
Ivačič was signed by Portland Timbers on 18 January 2019. He made his debut for the club in a 6–1 victory over the San Jose Earthquakes on 19 September 2020, earning three saves and giving up one goal.

References

External links
 NZS profile 
 

1993 births
Living people
Footballers from Ljubljana
Slovenian footballers
Slovenia youth international footballers
Association football goalkeepers
NK Olimpija Ljubljana (2005) players
NK Bela Krajina players
NK Radomlje players
Pafos FC players
Portland Timbers players
Portland Timbers 2 players
Slovenian Second League players
Slovenian PrvaLiga players
USL Championship players
Major League Soccer players
Slovenian expatriate footballers
Expatriate footballers in Cyprus
Slovenian expatriate sportspeople in Cyprus
Expatriate soccer players in the United States
Slovenian expatriate sportspeople in the United States